Sari Kärnä (born 2 April 1988) is a Finnish retired ice hockey player. She won a silver medal at the 2011 Winter Universiade and bronze medals at the IIHF World Women's Championships in 2015 and 2017 as a member of the Finnish national team. Her club career was played in the Naisten SM-sarja (renamed Naisten Liiga in 2017) with the Tampereen Ilves Naiset, Oulun Kärpät Naiset, and JYP Jyväskylä Naiset.

References

External links
 

1988 births
Living people
Finnish women's ice hockey forwards
People from Oulainen
JYP Jyväskylä Naiset players
Ilves Naiset players
Universiade medalists in ice hockey
Universiade silver medalists for Finland
Competitors at the 2011 Winter Universiade
Sportspeople from North Ostrobothnia